Jack Henry López (born December 16, 1992) is a Puerto Rican professional baseball infielder who is currently a free agent. He has  played in Major League Baseball (MLB) for the Boston Red Sox.

Baseball career

Amateur career
López graduated from Deltona High School in Deltona, Florida. He had a .462 batting average during his senior season and was named to the All-Central Florida baseball team. Although he was offered a full scholarship to play college baseball with the Miami Hurricanes, the Kansas City Royals selected López in the 16th round of the 2011 MLB draft, and he signed with the Royals for a $750,000 bonus.

Kansas City Royals
López began his professional career in 2012, splitting the season between the Rookie-level Idaho Falls Chukars and the Single-A Kane County Cougars. The following year, López was promoted to the High-A Wilmington Blue Rocks, where he batted .230/.297/.301 with 4 home runs and 45 RBI. He returned to Wilmington in 2014 and 2015, batting .215 and .238, respectively. In 2016, López advanced further through the Royals' farm system, reaching Double-A with the Northwest Arkansas Naturals. For the 2017 season, López began the season in Double-A, and spent the year there aside from a short stint with the Triple-A Omaha Storm Chasers of the Pacific Coast League. In 2018, López spent the year in Omaha, where he slashed .251/.279/.352 with 34 runs batted in (RBI) and a career-high 8 home runs. On November 2, 2018, López became a free agent.

Atlanta Braves
On March 9, 2019, López signed a minor league contract with the Atlanta Braves organization. He appeared in 96 games for the Triple-A Gwinnett Stripers of the International League in 2019, batting .273 with 12 home runs and 57 RBIs. López did not play in a game in 2020, as the minor-league season was canceled due to the COVID-19 pandemic. He elected free agency on November 2, 2020.

Boston Red Sox
On January 16, 2021, López signed a minor league contract with the Boston Red Sox organization. He began the season with the Double-A Portland Sea Dogs, and was promoted to the Triple-A Worcester Red Sox. López was on Boston's taxi squad in late August, traveling with the major-league team as a potential roster replacement. He was added to Boston's active roster on September 1, and made his MLB debut that evening against the Tampa Bay Rays. He was returned to Worcester on September 6, recalled to Boston on September 11, and returned to Worcester on September 21. López played in seven games for Boston, batting .154 (2-for-13). In the minor leagues, he played five games for Portland, batting 8-for-19 (.421), and 68 games for Worcester, where he had a .274 average. López became a free agent following the 2021 season.

Detroit Tigers
On February 9, 2022, López signed a minor league contract with the Detroit Tigers. He elected free agency on November 10, 2022.

Winter baseball
López has played in the Puerto Rican Winter League during the minor-league offseason, each year since the 2013–14 season. He has played for several teams in the league, including three seasons with Cangrejeros de Santurce.

International career
López played for Puerto Rico in the Caribbean Series of 2018–19, 2019–20, and 2020–21, batting over .300 in each series.

On July 2, 2021, López was named to the United States national baseball team for the 2020 Summer Olympics. He was granted a transfer of sports citizenship by the Puerto Rico Baseball Federation. The team went on to win silver, falling to Japan in the gold-medal game.

Personal life
López's father, Juan López, was a minor-league catcher who later served as bullpen coach for three different National League teams during 14 seasons between 1999 and 2013. López's uncle Onix Concepción was a shortstop for the Kansas City Royals, including their 1985 World Series team; he also played one game with the Pittsburgh Pirates.

References

Further reading

External links

Player profile at SoxProspects.com

1992 births
Living people
Major League Baseball infielders
Boston Red Sox players
Idaho Falls Chukars players
Kane County Cougars players
Wilmington Blue Rocks players
Cangrejeros de Santurce (baseball) players
Northwest Arkansas Naturals players
Tiburones de Aguadilla players
Omaha Storm Chasers players
Criollos de Caguas players
Gwinnett Stripers players
Indios de Mayagüez players
Portland Sea Dogs players
Worcester Red Sox players
People from Río Piedras, Puerto Rico
Major League Baseball players from Puerto Rico
Baseball players at the 2020 Summer Olympics
United States national baseball team players
Olympic baseball players of the United States
Medalists at the 2020 Summer Olympics
Olympic silver medalists for the United States in baseball